Eduardo Godinho Felipe (born 5 January 1976 in São Paulo), commonly known as Edu, is a Brazilian retired footballer who played as a defensive midfielder.

External links

1976 births
Living people
Footballers from São Paulo
Brazilian footballers
Association football midfielders
Criciúma Esporte Clube players
Veikkausliiga players
Tampere United players
Primeira Liga players
Liga Portugal 2 players
Segunda Divisão players
F.C. Penafiel players
S.C. Lusitânia players
A.D. Lousada players
U.S.C. Paredes players
A.D. Ovarense players
C.D. Aves players
C.D. Trofense players
Boavista F.C. players
Brazilian expatriate footballers
Expatriate footballers in Finland
Expatriate footballers in Portugal
Brazilian expatriate sportspeople in Finland
Brazilian expatriate sportspeople in Portugal